Delaneys Rovers GAA is a Gaelic Athletic Association club in Cork, Ireland. It draws its players from the Dublin Hill area on the northside of the city. Teams are fielded in Gaelic football, hurling and camogie. The club participates in Cork GAA competitions and in Seandún board competitions.Founding members were will o Sullivan and Tom mc carthy

History
The club is named after brothers Jeremiah and Cornelius Delaney, killed by British forces at their home at Dublin Hill on the night of 11–12 December 1920 (the night of The Burning of Cork). The two brothers were members of F Company, 1st Battalion, Cork No. 1 Brigade, I.R.A.

Achievements
 Cork Intermediate Hurling Championship Winner (1) 2002  Runners-Up 1997
 Cork Junior Hurling Championship Runners-Up 1982
 Cork Junior Football Championship Winners (1) 1955  Runner-Up 1951
 Cork Minor B Football Championship Winners (1) 1986  Runners-Up 1988, 1989
 Cork City Junior Hurling Championship Winners (5) 1974, 1980, 1982, 1986, 1988  Runners-Up 1971, 1972, 1991
 Cork City Junior Football Championship Winners (6) 1954, 1955, 1977, 2015, 2017, 2018  Runners-Up 1951, 1980, 2016

Notable players
 Barry Egan

References

Gaelic games clubs in County Cork
Hurling clubs in County Cork
Gaelic football clubs in County Cork